Edmond Dédé (November 20, 1827 – January 5, 1903) was an American musician and composer from New Orleans, Louisiana. A free-born Creole, he moved to Europe to study in Paris in 1855 and settled in France. His compositions include Quasimodo Symphony, Le Palmier Overture, Le Serment de L'Arabe and Patriotisme. For more than forty years, he worked as assistant conductor at the Grand Théâtre and subsequently as conductor of the orchestras at the Théâtre l'Alcazar and the Folies bordelaises in Bordeaux.

Biography

Early life and education
Dédé was born in New Orleans, Louisiana, the fourth generation of a free family of that city. His father was a marketman, poultry dealer, and music teacher. As a boy, Dédé first learned the clarinet, but soon switched to the violin, on which he was considered a prodigy. He would later go on to perform compositions of his own as well as those by Rodolphe Kreutzer, a favored composer of his. Dédé's teachers in his youth included violinists Constantin Debergue and Italian-born Ludovico Gabici, who was the director of the St. Charles Theater Orchestra. He was taught music theory by Eugène Prévost and New York-born black musician Charles-Richard Lambert, the father of Sidney and Charles Lucien Lambert.

Dédé's instruction from Gabici ended when he left to seek work in Mexico at the end of the Mexican-American War in 1848. When he eventually returned to the US at the end of 1852, he worked as a cigar maker, saving money to be able to travel to Europe. He went first to Paris and then Belgium, where he helped his friend Joseph Tinchant set up a branch of the Tinchant family's cigar business. He returned to Paris around 1857 and became an auditeur at the Paris Conservatoire. He studied at the Conservatoire with Jean Delphin Alard and Fromental Halevy.

Bordeaux
In the early 1860s, Edmond Dédé went to Bordeaux to take up a position as assistant conductor for the ballet at the Grand Théâtre. Within a few years, he found employment at the Théâtre l'Alcazar, a popular café-concert in the city. Later in the 1870s, he moved to the Folies Bordelaises. Throughout Dédé continued to compose art and music, which he sought to have performed at the more prestigious Grand Théâtre.'Samuel Snaer, Jr. (1835–1900), an African-American conductor and musician, conducted the first performance in New Orleans of Dédé's Quasimodo Symphony. It was premiered on the night of May 10, 1865, in the New Orleans Theater to a large audience of prominent free people of color of New Orleans and Northern whites. Dédé was not present at this performance.

After settling in Bordeaux in 1864, he returned to New Orleans only once, in 1893. During the voyage to the United States, his freighter sank, occasioning a rescue. When he reached New Orleans, three benefit concerts were held in his honor, in which he participated. New Orleans' musical innovators and musical elite, including Jelly Roll Morton's teacher, William J. Nickerson, took part in the concerts. The welcome committee that organized the concerts for Dédé overlapped with the membership of the Citizens Committee, the group of social and legal activists who brought the legal challenges that led to the Plessy v. Ferguson ruling in 1896.
 
Dédé died on January 5, 1903, in Paris. Many of his compositions have been preserved at the Bibliothèque Nationale de France in Paris.

On November 20, 2021, Google featured Dédé on its U.S. home page as a "Google Doodle" to honor his 194th birthday.

Personal life
In 1864 Dédé married a Frenchwoman, Sylvie Leflet, and settled in Bordeaux. They had one son, who became a music hall conductor and composer of popular songs.

Dédé was Catholic.

Major compositionsMon Pauvre Coeur (1852)
 Quasimodo Symphony (1865)
 Le Palmier Overture  (1865)
 Le Serment de L'Arabe (1865) (written during a stint in Algeria)
 Méphisto Masqué (186?)  (ophicleide and orchestra, with Mirlitone Instruments, or piano solo)
 Morgiane, ou, Le sultan d'Ispahan (1887) (opera in four acts)

References

Further reading
 

McKee, Sally (2017). The Exile's Song: Edmond Dédé and the Unfinished Revolutions of the Atlantic World.'' Yale University Press.

External links
 Brief biography of Dédé
 Edmond Dede, African American Composer, Violinist & Conductor 
Manuscript score for Morgiane, ou, Le sultan d'Ispahan (1887), Houghton Library, Harvard University 

African-American conductors (music)
African-American male composers
Musicians from New Orleans
Conservatoire de Paris alumni
1827 births
1903 deaths
African-American Catholics
19th-century American male musicians
American expatriates in France
19th-century African-American musicians
Louisiana Creole people
Free people of color